George Bailey (1885 – 17 September 1914) was a British gymnast. He competed in the men's artistic individual all-around event at the 1908 Summer Olympics.

References

1885 births
1914 deaths
British male artistic gymnasts
Olympic gymnasts of Great Britain
Gymnasts at the 1908 Summer Olympics
Place of birth missing